Rieko Matsunaga (born May 19, 1979, Tokyo) is a Japanese rhythmic gymnast.

Matsunaga competed for Japan in the rhythmic gymnastics individual all-around competition at the 2000 Summer Olympics in Sydney. There she was 16th in the qualification round and did not advance to the final of 10 competitors.

References

External links 
 Rieko Matsunaga at Sports-Reference.com

1979 births
Living people
Japanese rhythmic gymnasts
Gymnasts at the 2000 Summer Olympics
Olympic gymnasts of Japan
Gymnasts from Tokyo
Asian Games medalists in gymnastics
Gymnasts at the 1998 Asian Games
Asian Games silver medalists for Japan
Medalists at the 1998 Asian Games
20th-century Japanese women